Li Jianxiong (born 10 December 1960) is a Chinese water polo player. He competed in the men's tournament at the 1988 Summer Olympics.

References

1960 births
Living people
Chinese male water polo players
Olympic water polo players of China
Water polo players at the 1988 Summer Olympics
Place of birth missing (living people)
Asian Games medalists in water polo
Water polo players at the 1982 Asian Games
Water polo players at the 1986 Asian Games
Medalists at the 1982 Asian Games
Medalists at the 1986 Asian Games
Asian Games gold medalists for China
20th-century Chinese people